Epioblasma obliquata, commonly called the catspaw, is a species of freshwater mussel. It is native to eastern North America, where it is classified as endangered under the Endangered Species Act.

Natural history and conservation
This species was historically widespread in the Ohio River and Great Lakes drainage basins. Like many other North American freshwater mussels, it relies on a habitat of shallow, gravelly riffle zones in larger rivers. This oxygen-rich habitat has largely been destroyed over the past 200 years by dam construction and dredging, which caused a massive population decline.

Both subspecies, the white catspaw and the purple catspaw, are critically endangered. By the time E. obliquata obliquata, the purple catspaw, was listed in 1990 under the Endangered Species Act, no surviving breeding populations were known. This changed in 1994 when a few young individuals were found in Killbuck Creek, Ohio, indicating a small breeding population. An attempt to collect young individuals was made in order to start a captive breeding program. However, to the researchers disappointment, surveys from 2006–2007 recorded a population of only 12 males and zero females. It wasn't until 2012 that researchers were able to find their first female individuals that could be used for captive breeding programs, which are now underway.

The status of subspecies E. obliquata perobliqua, the white catspaw, is more dire. Only a single population has persisted into the modern day, found in Fish Creek, a tributary of the St. Joseph River in Indiana. At this location, only five living individuals were documented during surveys from 1975 to 1999, with the last living female recorded in 1975. Since then, surveys of Fish Creek have failed to find any living white catspaw mussels.

Taxonomy
This species exhibits variable shell characteristics, which have been taxonomically treated as either subspecies or separate species.  Citing phylogeny, shell characteristics and allopatry, the Fish and Wildlife Service, supported by Williams et al. (2017), has separated the purple and white catspaws into distinct species, each protected by the Endangered Species Act as an endangered species.
 
 Purple catspaw (Epioblasma obliquata obliquata), now protected federally as Epioblasma obliquata
 White catspaw (Epioblasma obliquata perobliqua), now protected federally as Epioblasma perobliqua (Conrad, 1836)

References

obliquata
ESA endangered species
Taxa named by Constantine Samuel Rafinesque